Count Eugenio Brunetta d'Usseaux (14 December 1857 – 8 January 1919) was an Italian nobleman.

His father, the count Carlo Augusto Brunetta of Usseaux was a high-degree official of the Royal Sardinian Army, headquartered in the same city. The mother was Carolyne Mattone of Benevello also come from an Italian noble family who owned the Castle of Mazzè (near Turin), related to the family Valperga since seven centuries before.

Born in Vercelli into a family of French origin, Brunetta d'Usseaux was educated in Turin.

After the beginning of the Second Italian War of Independence, he had gone on living here with his mother, because their home based in Vercelli was too near the military front, as the border of Kingdom of Lombardy–Venetia.

At the end of the studies in the exclusive Nobles College located in the modern Academy of Science of Turin, Brunetta married the countess Catherine Zeyffart, a landowner of enormous plots in Ukraine, which was descendant from an ancient and noble Russian family, maybe linked to the Romanov dynasty of Zar.
When she died in 1897, count Eugenio Brunetta went to live in Paris, where by many years he was living nine months a year in his property home, just coming in Italy during the summer.

Himself an active rower and rider, the count was very interested in sports, and was in Paris that he met with Baron Pierre de Coubertin interested to him, for the reinstatement of the Olympic Games. His engagement for the sports (ideals) was so very close to him, that in 1897 Brunetta d'Usseaux become member of the International Olympic Committee (IOC), which he remained until his death, as general secretary since 1908. Till the 21st century, he was the only Italian person recovering this charge.

He succeeded in bringing the 1908 Summer Olympics to Rome, but Italy had to forfeit the organization of the Olympics in 1906, due to financial and organisational problems. The 1908 Games were held in London instead. That same year, Brunetta d'Usseaux was appointed secretary of the IOC. In this position, he tried to get winter sports on the Olympic programme, and suggested to have a separate winter sports week attached to the 1912 Summer Olympics in Stockholm. This was opposed by the Swedish organizers, but Brunetta d'Usseaux managed to get a winter sports week scheduled for 1916. Due to World War I, these Olympics were never organized.

The count died, under unclear circumstances, in France in 1919, and would not live to see the first Winter Olympic Games in 1924, maybe in Nice. At that time, he would to come in Russia for acknowledging the family of his wife, after the start of Russian Revolution.

He would to be buried in Pinerolo, but never come there.

He was appointed as Bailiff of Honour and Devotion of the Sovereign Military Order of Malta.

1857 births
1919 deaths
People from Vercelli